Eremiascincus is a genus of skinks, lizards in the family Scincidae. The genus is endemic to Australia, Indonesia, and East Timor.

Species
The genus contains the following 15 valid species, listed alphabetically by specific name.
Eremiascincus antoniorum (M.A. Smith, 1927)
Eremiascincus brongersmai (Storr, 1972) – brown-sided bar-lipped skink 
Eremiascincus butlerorum (Aplin, How & Boeadi, 1993)
Eremiascincus douglasi (Storr, 1967) – orange-sided bar-lipped skink 
Eremiascincus emigrans (Lidth de Jeude, 1895)
Eremiascincus fasciolatus (Günther, 1867) – narrow-banded sand-swimmer, thick-tailed skink 
Eremiascincus intermedius (Sternfeld, 1919) – northern narrow–banded skink
Eremiascincus isolepis (Boulenger, 1887) – northern bar-lipped skink, short-legged slender skink
Eremiascincus musivus Mecke, Doughty & Donnellan, 2009 – mosaic desert skink
Eremiascincus pallidus (Günther, 1875) – western sand-swimming skink, western narrow-banded skink
Eremiascincus pardalis (Macleay, 1877) – lowlands bar-lipped skink
Eremiascincus phantasmus Mecke, Doughty & Donnellan, 2013 – ghost skink
Eremiascincus richardsonii (Gray, 1845) – broad-banded sand-swimmer, Richardson's skink
Eremiascincus rubiginosus Mecke & Doughty, 2018 – rusty skink
Eremiascincus timorensis (Greer, 1990)

Nota bene: A binomial authority in parentheses indicates that the species was originally described in a genus other than Eremiascincus.

References

Further reading
Greer AE (1979). "Eremiascincus, a new generic name for some Australian sand swimming skinks (Lacertilia: Scincidae)". Rec. Australian Mus. 32 (7): 321–388. ("Eremiascincus New Genus", p. 323).

 
Skinks of Australia
Taxa named by Allen Eddy Greer